Year 1070 (MLXX) was a common year starting on Friday (link will display the full calendar) of the Julian calendar, the 1070th year of the Common Era (CE) and Anno Domini (AD) designations, the 70th year of the 2nd millennium, the 70th year of the 11th century, and the 1st year of the 1070s decade.

Events 
 Spring – King Sweyn II joins the English rebels, led by Hereward (the Wake), and captures the Isle of Ely (located in The Fens) in East Anglia. Hereward sacks Peterborough Abbey in support with Sweyn's Danes.
 Harrying of the North: King William I (the Conqueror) quells rebellions in the north of England, following an invasion by Sweyn II. Widespread famine follows the devastation wrought.
 April 11 – Archbishop of Canterbury Stigand is deposed.
 June – Denmark signs a treaty with England; Sweyn II and his forces leave the country.
 August 15 – The Pavian-born Benedictine Lanfranc is appointed as the new Archbishop of Canterbury in England.
 An invasion of England by Malcolm III of Scotland is repelled.
 Hugh d'Avranches, 1st Earl of Chester, the first Marcher Lord, invades Wales, capturing parts of Gwynedd.
 A successful Byzantine counter-attack drives the Seljuq Turks across the Euphrates.
 Bergen is founded by King Olaf III of Norway; it will function as the main city and capital of Norway, until it is replaced by Oslo in 1314.
 Chinese Chancellor Wang Anshi starts the Xining Reforms (which last until 1085).
 Jews from Rouen in Normandy settle in England, at the invitation of King William I.
 The Temple of Literature, Hanoi, is established in Hanoi, capital of Vietnam.
 Uyghur poet Yusuf Khass Hajib of Balasagun, in the Kara-Khanid Khanate, completes the Kutadgu Bilig ("The Wisdom Which Brings Good Fortune"), and presents it to the prince of Kashgar.
 Song dynasty Chinese astronomer, engineer, and statesman Su Song completes the compilation of the Ben Cao Tu Jing, a pharmaceutical treatise with related subjects of botany, zoology, mineralogy, and metallurgy.
 Canterbury Cathedral in England is rebuilt, following a fire.
 The rebuilding of York Minster in England begins.
 Construction of Richmond Castle in North Yorkshire, England, by Alan Rufus begins.
 Approximate date – Halsten Stenkilsson is deposed as king of Sweden, with Håkan the Red becoming king in Götaland, and Anund Gårdske being chosen as king of Svealand.

Births 
 Allucio of Campugliano, Italian diplomat (d. 1134)
 Bertrade de Montfort, queen of France (d. 1117)
 Buthaina bint al-Mu'tamid ibn Abbad, Al-Andalus poet
 Coloman (the Learned), king of Hungary (d. 1116)
 Eupraxia of Kiev, Holy Roman Empress (d. 1109)
 Gertrude of Flanders, duchess of Lorraine (d. 1117)
 Giso IV, count of Gudensberg (approximate date)
 Gualfardo of Verona, Italian trader and hermit (d. 1127)
 Guerric of Igny, French abbot (approximate date)
 Henry I (the Elder), German nobleman (d. 1103)
 Hugues de Payens, French knight (approximate date)
 John Komnenos, Byzantine aristocrat and official
 Lothair Udo III, margrave of the Nordmark (d. 1106)
 Meinhard I, German nobleman (approximate date)
 Otto (the Rich), German nobleman (approximate date)
 Ralph of Pont-Echanfray, Norman knight (d. 1120)
 Ramiro Sánchez, Spanish nobleman (approximate date)
 Ranulf le Meschin, 3rd Earl of Chester (d. 1129)
 Rostislav Vsevolodovich, Kievan prince (d. 1093)
 Sancho Nunes de Barbosa, Portuguese nobleman (d. 1130)
 Tescelin le Roux, Burgundian knight (approximate date)
 Thurstan, archbishop of York (approximate date)
 William de Corbeil, archbishop of Canterbury (d. 1136)
 William of Champeaux, French philosopher (d. 1121)

Deaths 
 March 6 – Ulric I (or Oldaric), margrave of Carniola
 April 14 – Gerard (the Great), duke of Lorraine
 June 12 – Guido of Acqui (or Wido), Italian bishop
 July 6 
 Godelieve, Flemish saint (approximate date)
 Said al-Andalusi, Taghlib Arab astronomer (b. 1029)
 July 17 – Baldwin VI (the Good), count of Flanders
 Abu 'Ubayd al-Juzjani, Persian physician and chronicler
 Athirajendra Chola, Indian ruler of the Chola Empire
 Áurea of San Millán, Spanish anchorite (b. 1043)
 Bisantius Guirdeliku, Italian nobleman (patrikios)
 Filarete of Calabria, Sicilian monk and saint
 Hārūn ibn Malik al-Turk, Turkic military leader 
 Theobald of Dorat, French monk and saint (b. 990)
 Vigrahapala III, Indian ruler of the Pala Empire

References